Passiflora actinia, also known as the sea anemone passion flower is a species of passion flower (passionfruit) of the Passifloraceae. It flowers mainly in early spring, producing white, mauve (purple), and blue flowers about 9 cm wide.

Passiflora actinia is an evergreen vine. Native to Brazil, it is a relatively cold tolerant passion flower, and can be seen in gardens in England. Its edible fruit (a passionfruit) is golden orange when ripe, and about 10 cm long. Passion fruit is a good source of nutrients, especially fiber, vitamin C, and provitamin A.

A single purple passion fruit contains (1Trusted Source):

 Calories: 17
 Fiber: 2 grams
 Vitamin C: 9% of the Daily Value (DV)
 Vitamin A: 8% of the DV
 Iron: 2% of the DV
 Potassium: 2% of the D

Its specific name might be in reference to the scientific name of the sea anemones (Actiniara), since it resembles one.

References

External links
 
 

actinia